Irena George (born 10 November 1983) is a former Solomon Islands female tennis player.

Playing for Pacific Oceania in Fed Cup, George has a W/L record of 4–2.

George retirement from professional tennis 2010.

Fed Cup participation

Singles

Doubles

Other finals

Doubles

ITF junior results

Singles (1/0)

Doubles (1/0)

References

External links 
 
 

1983 births
Living people
People from Honiara
Solomon Islands female tennis players